The 1915 Appleby by-election was held on 27 October 1915.  The by-election was held due to the incumbent Conservative MP, Sir Lancelot Sanderson, becoming a judge on the High Court of Justice.  It was won by the Conservative candidate Cecil Lowther who was unopposed due to a War-time electoral pact.

References

1915 elections in the United Kingdom
1915 in England
20th century in Westmorland
By-elections to the Parliament of the United Kingdom in Cumbria constituencies
By-elections to the Parliament of the United Kingdom in Westmorland constituencies
Unopposed by-elections to the Parliament of the United Kingdom (need citation)
Appleby-in-Westmorland
October 1915 events